The anterior cervical lymph nodes are a group of nodes found on the anterior part of the neck, in front of the sternocleidomastoid muscle. These can be grouped into a deep and superficial group.

The superficial group drain the superficial surfaces of the anterior neck.

External links
 http://www.aafp.org/afp/20021201/2103.html
 https://web.archive.org/web/20090818165508/http://www.thelymphnodes.com/anterior-cervical-lymph-nodes.php
 http://www.emedicine.com/ent/topic306.htm#section~anatomy_of_the_cervical_lymphatics

Lymphatics of the head and neck